The 1874 Open Championship was the 14th Open Championship, held 10 April at Musselburgh Links, Musselburgh, East Lothian, Scotland. Mungo Park won the Championship, by two strokes from runner-up Tom Morris, Jr. This was the first Open Championship played at Musselburgh.

Play started at about 12 noon in dull and showery weather but later in the day the weather improved. The course, especially the greens, "were rather heavy".

Many of the spectators followed Tom Morris, Jr. and Willie Park, Sr. who were paired together. Morris started badly and came to grief in several bunkers. Park scored 40 in the first round to Morris's 42. However, as the day progressed, Morris improved while Park fell away. The best player in the first two rounds was Mungo Park with scores of 37 and 38. At this stage he led by 4 from G. McCachnie, 5 from George Paxton with Tom Morris, Jr. and Willie Park a full 8 shots behind.

Mungo Park had a third round 43 with G. McCachnie, George Paxton, Jamie Anderson and Tom Morris, Jr. each four behind at that stage. Bob Martin was a further shot behind after a third round 38. Mungo Park scored 41 in his final round and although Morris again played a useful round he still finished two behind. McCachnie fell away with a closing 47. "During the last round the utmost excitement prevailed, and as each couple came in a knot of spectators gathered round them to ascertain what luck had attended them."

Final leaderboard
Source:

Friday, 10 April 1874

References

External links
Musselburgh Links 1874 (Official site)

The Open Championship
Golf tournaments in Scotland
Open Championship
Open Championship
Open Championship